Carole E. Joffe is an American sociologist and reproductive rights advocate who has published several books on abortion. 
In 2013, she was awarded the Society of Family Planning Lifetime Achievement Award for her research on the sociology of abortion and family planning. 
She has also earned the UC Davis Public Service Award (2006), the Irwin Kushner Lecture by the Association of Reproductive Health Professionals (2010), and the David Gunn Lifetime Achievement Award from the Abortion Care Network (2015).

Life
Joffe earned her Ph.D. from the University of California, Berkeley.

She is a professor emerita at the University of California, Davis, and currently a professor of obstetrics, gynecology, and reproductive sciences at ANSIRH (Advancing New Standards in Reproductive Health), part of the University of California, San Francisco.

Publications 
 Friendly Intruders: Childcare Professionals and Family Life (1977)
 The Regulation of Sexuality: Experiences of Family Planning Workers (1986)
 Doctors of Conscience: The Struggle to Provide Abortion before and after Roe v Wade (1996)
 Dispatches from the Abortion Wars: The Costs of Fanaticism to Doctors, Patients and the Rest of Us (2009)

References 

American sociologists
American women scientists
American women sociologists
University of California, Davis faculty
University of California, San Francisco faculty
University of California, Berkeley alumni
Living people
Year of birth missing (living people)
21st-century American women